Jendouba Sport (often referred to as JS) is a football club from Jendouba in Tunisia. Founded in 1922, under the name Association Sportive de Souk El-Arbâa – translated: Sports Association of Souk El-Arbâa- (ASSA), the team plays in red and black colours.

History
The club was first promoted to the Premier League CLP-1 in 2005, Jendouba creates the surprise in its first match by winning the great Esperance Sportive de Tunis at the first day of the championship (2 goals 0). Despite its great performance against the top Tunisian Clubs, Jendouba Sports does not, however, manage to stay in League I.

The club plays in League II during the 2006–2007 season.

In April 2007, after a victory against its immediate follower Olympique du Kef by scoring four goals to zero, the club finish second in the championship behind Stade Gabèsien. They therefore qualify for the League I with their new coach Adel Sellimi.

Achievements
Promoted from the CLP-2: 1
2006/07

Selected former coaches
 Mohammed Jelassi (2007–08)

External links
 1st Fans Website

Football clubs in Tunisia
Association football clubs established in 1922
1922 establishments in Tunisia
Sports clubs in Tunisia